Berlin-Alexanderplatz or The Story of Franz Biberkopf is a 1931 German drama film directed by Phil Jutzi and starring Heinrich George, Maria Bard and  Margarete Schlegel. It was adapted from the 1929 novel of the same title by Alfred Döblin, who also co-wrote the screenplay.

Plot
George portrays a blue collar Berliner and small-time criminal recently released from prison who finds himself being drawn into the Berlin underworld of the 1920s after his prostitute lover is murdered.

"Yet, despite social upheaval, ...the good among the working class still prove able to live an honest and decent life."

Production
It was filmed on various locations around Berlin including the Alexanderplatz. Jutzi cut out much of the novel's complex story, preferring to focus on just one character.

The Film Review Board released the film on September 30, 1931, but with the restriction that it was forbidden for young people. The premiere took place on October 8, 1931 in the Berlin Capitol am Zoo. The film was distributed by Südfilm AG (Berlin).

Cast

References

Bibliography

Further reading

External links 
 

1931 drama films
1931 films
German black-and-white films
Films of the Weimar Republic
Films about prostitution in Germany
Films based on German novels
Films set in Berlin
Films shot in Berlin
1930s German-language films
Films directed by Phil Jutzi
Cine-Allianz films
German drama films
1930s German films